Immoderatus is a genus of flies belonging to the family Lesser Dung flies.

Species
Immoderatus foldvarii Papp, 2004 - Thailand

References

Sphaeroceridae
Diptera of Asia
Sphaeroceroidea genera